The David Carpenter House is a former residence currently operating as a restaurant called the Hathaway House.  It is located at 424 West Adrian Street (U.S. Route 223) in the village of Blissfield in Blissfield Township, Michigan.  It was designated as a Michigan State Historic Site on August 13, 1971, and also later listed on the National Register of Historic Places on November 20, 1979.

Built in approximately 1851, it is a rather large Greek Revival house built by New York native and merchant David Carpenter, who was one of Lenawee County's most prominent residents when he moved to the area in 1838.  The house originally contained 18 rooms, which included a card room, several parlors, dining room, library, three kitchens, and five bedrooms.  Several walls were removed at later dates to create larger rooms.  Minor additions, such as the addition of a second story to the side wings, were added soon after its construction.

Carpenter lived in the house from 1851 until his death in 1891.  After his death, the house passed to other members of his family, and it was sold to the Hathaway family at the turn of the century.  It remained a private residence until 1960 when it was converted into the Hathaway House restaurant by the Weeber family.  In 1995, the most recent addition included a back parlor and new back porch.  Today, the structure includes three dining rooms and two parlors on the main floor and three dining rooms and a ballroom on the second floor.  The structure has retained most of its exterior details since it was first constructed.

References

External links
 The Hathaway House

Houses in Lenawee County, Michigan
Houses on the National Register of Historic Places in Michigan
Greek Revival houses in Michigan
Restaurants in Michigan
Michigan State Historic Sites
Houses completed in 1851
Restaurants established in 1960
1960 establishments in Michigan
National Register of Historic Places in Lenawee County, Michigan